Sympistis rayata is a species of moth in the family Noctuidae (the owlet moths). It is found in North America.

The MONA or Hodges number for Sympistis rayata is 10119.1.

References

Further reading

 
 
 

rayata
Articles created by Qbugbot
Moths described in 1908